Nenjamundu Nermaiyundu is a 1991 Tamil language film directed by Ramdhass. Ramarajan and Rupini played the lead roles in the film, while Chinni Jayanth, Goundamani, Senthil and Vijayakumar played the supporting roles. S. A. Rajkumar was the music director of the film. Produced by the Maila Films Production, the film was released on 5 November 1991.

Cast
 Ramarajan
 Rupini
 Chinni Jayanth
 Goundamani
 Senthil
 Vijayakumar
 Vadivukkarasi
 Kitty
 J. Livingston

Reference

1991 films
Films scored by S. A. Rajkumar
1990s Tamil-language films